Bramwell Garnet 'George' Braybrook (1910-1975) was an Australian rugby league footballer who played in the 1930s.

Playing career
Garnet Braybrook, sometimes known as George Braybrook played for the Newtown rugby league club for 5 seasons between 1933-1934 and 1936–1938. He won a premiership when played on the wing in the 1933 Grand Final win over St. George. He was the father of former NSWRFL referee, Denis Braybrook. Braybrook was a Newtown stalwart and an active supporter of the club during his lifetime.

Death
Braybrook died  on 5 November 1975 aged 65.

References

1910 births
1975 deaths
Newtown Jets players
Australian rugby league players
Rugby league wingers
Rugby league players from Sydney